Sylvia's Meadow, a Site of Special Scientific Interest, is a  nature reserve owned and managed by Cornwall Wildlife Trust. It is a herb rich,  site situated near Gunnislake, in East Cornwall, England.

History
During World War II a US military camp was situated in Sylvia's Meadow which housed only white American armed forces personnel. Black American airmen were billeted in an adjacent field. Since then the land has been left unploughed and unimproved. In this respect Sylvia's Meadow is virtually unique to Cornwall.

The meadow was designated a Site of Special Scientific Interest in 1992.

The reserve is named after a previous owner's daughter.

Flora and fauna
Sylvia's Meadow is an example of unimproved herb-rich pasture land containing some rare plant species. It is famed for the orchids that grow there, which include the lesser butterfly orchid and heath spotted orchid. Other species found here include: autumn ladies'-tresses, sneezewort, yellow rattle and bird's foot trefoil.

Butterflies that may be seen include wall, orange tip, dingy skipper and the common blue. Reptile sightings include the common lizard and the slow worm.

References

External links
Cornwall Wildlife Trust: Sylvia's Meadow
BBC Cornwall feature on the reserve
Breathing Places (includes location map of the reserve)

Nature reserves of the Cornwall Wildlife Trust
Sites of Special Scientific Interest in Cornwall
Sites of Special Scientific Interest notified in 1992
Meadows in Cornwall